Arborfield is a village on the A327 road in Berkshire about  south-east of Reading, about  west of Wokingham.

Etymology
The name 'Arborfield' is first recorded in 1166 as Edburgefeld, meaning 'Edburga's Field', Edburga being a widespread Anglo-Saxon lady's name. It evolved through variations to the modern Arborfield as first recorded in the 17th century.

Notable buildings

Arborfield Hall

The manor house, which originally stood on the site, was occupied by the Bullock family from the mid-12th century. The last Arborfield Hall, built in 1837, was the home of Sir John Conroy, Controller of the Household of the Duchess of Kent. It was demolished in 1955.

Churches
The present Church of England parish church of Saint Bartholomew is a Gothic Revival building designed by J Picton and built in 1863. The new building replaces an older St Bartholomew's church that had been built in the 13th century and altered probably early in the 18th century. When the new church was consecrated the roof of the old one was removed and later layers of plaster stripped from the interior walls, revealing Medieval wall paintings of "figure subjects and geometrical and masonry patterns" that "covered the walls". These have now been lost and the church ruins have greatly deteriorated. The army garrison has its own garrison church, a 20th-century building dedicated to Saint Eligius.

Army garrison

Arborfield is also known for the School of Electronic & Aeronautical Engineering (SEAE) where the British Army train their Electronic, Aircraft and Avionic engineers for RADAR, Telecommunications, Control Equipment, Aircraft (Airframes and Engines) and Avionic (Aviation electronic and weapon system) modalities. Arborfield Garrison is about  the other side of Arborfield Cross and which is mostly in the civil parish of Barkham.

International Cocoa Quarantine Centre
Since 1985, Arborfield has also been the home of the International Cocoa Quarantine Centre whose aim is to investigate and reduce diseases in cocoa plants worldwide.

References

Sources

External links

Arborfield Community Website

Villages in Berkshire
Borough of Wokingham
Former civil parishes in Berkshire